Jersey has an unwritten constitution arising from the Treaty of Paris (1259). When Henry III and the King of France came to terms over the Duchy of Normandy, the Norman mainland the suzerainty of the King of France. The Channel Islands however remained loyal to the British crown due to the loyalties of its Seigneurs. But they were never absorbed into the Kingdom of England by any Act of Union and exist as "peculiars of the Crown".

This peculiar political position has often been to the benefit of islanders. Until the 19th century, the island was generally able to be exempt from the harsher parts of Westminster legislation, while being included in favourable policies, such as protectionist economic policies. England, and later the United Kingdom, passively exploited the strategic benefits of the Channel Islands. For example, they were able to serve as a convenient stop-off point for trade to Gascony.

Legislation 
Legislation relating to the organisation of government includes:

Reform 

Campaigns for constitutional reform during the 19th century successfully called for: the replacement of lay Jurats with professional judges in the Royal Court to decide questions of law; the establishment of a Police Court (later known as the Magistrate's Court); the creation of a Petty Debts Court; a professional, salaried police force for St Helier in addition to the Honorary Police; and the reform of "archaic procedure of the Royal Court for criminal trials". In 1845, the elected office of deputy was created though this did little to redress the disparity of representation between the rural and urban parishes: in 1854 St Helier contained over half of the island's population, yet was able to elect only three out of the 14 deputies.

Two significant constitutional reforms took place during the 20th century. In 1946, the States of Jersey drew up plans for change following the German Occupation, which were examined by a Committee of the Privy Council. No change was made to the functions of the Bailiff. The twelve Jurats were removed from the assembly of the States of Jersey and replaced by twelve senators elected on an island-wide basis who would have no judicial functions. The twelve Rectors also lost their place in the States assembly. No reforms were made to the role of the Deputies in the assembly. The second major reforms took place in December 2005, when the States of Jersey Law 2005 came into force. This created a system of ministerial government to replace the previous committee-based administration.

Electoral reform is a topic of debate on the island. The 2000 Clothier report recommended the reform of the composition of the States to have a single type of member known as a Member of the States of Jersey (MSJ). In 2009, the States Assembly rejected proposals to keep the 12 Connétables and introduce 37 deputies elected to six "super-constituencies". In 2010, the States assembly agreed to holding elections for all seats on a single date and to cut the number of Senators from 12 to 8. In 2016, a proposition (P.2016/113) was voted on in the States concerning changes to its composition. The 12 Parish Connétables would retain their position as States Members, with 32 Senators elected from six large districts, each electing either six or five Senators. In 2021, the States Assembly voted a large reform of their composition from the 2022 general election. The role of Senators will be abolished and the eight senators replaced with an increased number of deputies. The 37 deputies will be elected from nine super constituencies, rather than in individual parishes as they are now. Although efforts were made the remove the Connétables, they will continue their historic role as States members.

In December 2010, a committee chaired by Lord Carswell recommended changes to the role of the Bailiff—in particular that the Bailiff should cease to the presiding officer over the States Assembly.

The States Assembly agreed in March 2011 to establish an independent electoral commission to review the make-up of the assembly and government.

In April 2011, Deputy Le Claire lodged au Greffe a request for the Chief Minister to produce, for debate, a draft written "Constitution for Jersey"; the States Assembly did not support this idea.

Clothier report 
The Report of the Review Panel on the Machinery of Government in Jersey was released in December 2020 with an aim to provide a deep reform of the island's governance system.

The report recommended a reform of the electoral system. They recommended that an independent Chief Electoral Officer be appointed, that elections be reformed to become single-day general elections (for all States Members, including Connétables) and that candidates be required to submit a brief statement on policies and objectives for the next term.

The report recommended alterations to the composition of the States. According to the report, the role of Senator should be abolished and replaced with 12 additional States members; the Connétables should no longer be States Members ex officio, being required to run for office separately if they wish to sit in the States; that discrepancies between the number of representatives and the parishes' populations should be evened out; that the name Deputy should be replaced with Member of the States of Jersey and that the total size of the Assembly should be between 42 and 44 members.

The report recommended that the existing Committee structure, made of twenty four committees, should be abolished and replaced. They recommended that the number of portfolios was too large, and should be reduced; that for the committees there should be established a number of departments (as few as seven); the political direction of each department should be the purview of a Minister and one or two other members; that a Council of Ministers should be created, invested with sufficient powers; that a Treasury Department should be established to take over the Resources role of the Policy and Resources Committee and that new Scrutiny committees should be established to scuritinise the Council of Ministers.

On the role of the Bailiff, the report recommended that he should cease to act as the president of the States assembly and that a Speaker should be elected instead by the States. They also recommended he no longer be the principal link with the Home Office. Instead, he should focus his full time on his role as the Chief Justice of the Island and his position as the Lord Chancellor-equivalent for the island should be respected.

Otherwise, the report also recommended that facilities for States members be improved, with the establishment of a Committee of Members, which would provide proper facilities for all Members; that a Jersey (or Channel Islands) Ombudsman be appointed to hear complaints about Government Departments and that there should be regular use of consultative papers.

Role of the United Kingdom 

The Crown Dependencies have each had a historic and complex relationship with the United Kingdom and with its predecessors. Jersey is not, and has never been, part of the United Kingdom, the Kingdom of Great Britain or the Kingdom of England, however it has been a dependency of the monarch of each of these states at their time of existence. Therefore, the government in Westminster has played an important role in Jersey's lawmaking and political landscape since Jersey was separated from the Norman mainland. Furthermore, the island's strong non-political links with Great Britain has meant that the British political goings-on have frequently had a strong effect on Jersey's politics.

Unlike the situation of the British Overseas Territories, the UK Parliament has never been the constitutional link between the Channel Islands and the UK and the island has never had representation in the House of Commons. The link is instead through the monarch. Within the United Kingdom government, responsibility for relations between Jersey (and the other Crown dependencies) and the United Kingdom lie in the Crown Dependencies Branch within the International Directorate of the Ministry of Justice, which has a core team of three officials, with four others and four lawyers available when required.

In 2010, the House of Commons Justice Committee, conducting an inquiry into the Crown dependencies, found that the Jersey government and those of the other islands were "with some important caveats, content with their relationship with the Ministry of Justice". Tensions have, however, arisen from time to time. In the 1980s, there were discussions about a financial contribution from Jersey towards the United Kingdom's costs in relation to defence and international representation. In March 2009, the House of Lords Constitution Committee criticised UK government proposals in the Borders, Citizenship and Immigration Bill dealing with the Common Travel Area, concluding that "the policy-making process ... has not been informed by any real appreciation of the constitutional status of the Crown dependencies or the rights of free movement of Islanders". In 2009, the UK cancelled the reciprocal health agreement with Jersey, though a new one came into effect in April 2011.

According to constitutional convention United Kingdom legislation may be extended to Jersey by Order in Council at the request of the Island's government. Whether an Act of the United Kingdom Parliament may expressly apply to the Island as regards matters of self-government, or whether this historic power is now in abeyance, is a matter of legal debate. The States of Jersey Law 2005 established that no United Kingdom Act or Order in Council may apply to the Bailiwick without being referred to the States of Jersey.

Although Jersey is for most day-to-day purposes entirely self-governing in relation to its internal affairs, the Crown retains residual responsibility for the "good government" of the island. The UK government has consistently adopted a "non-interventionist policy", and following the "high degree of consensus amongst academics, legal advisers, politicians and officials" would only intervene "in the event of a fundamental breakdown in public order or the rule of law, endemic corruption in the government or other extreme circumstances". According to UK Ministry of Justice guidance, UK Government departments have a responsibility to engage directly with the Crown Dependencies.

References 

Jersey
Jersey law
Government of Jersey